Carlos James Lozada (September 6, 1946 – November 20, 1967) was a member of the United States Army who was one of five Puerto Ricans who received the Medal of Honor during the Vietnam War.

Early years
Lozada was born in Caguas, Puerto Rico. He graduated from high school in 1966 and soon married. Lozada then joined the Army.

Vietnam War
The United States at that time was involved in the Vietnam War and on June 11, 1967, Lozada was sent to Vietnam and assigned to Co. A, 2nd Battalion, 503 Infantry, 173rd Airborne Brigade.

Lozada's unit was heavily engaged during the Battle of Dak To. On November 20, 1967, PFC Lozada spotted a North Vietnamese Army company rapidly approaching his outpost. He alerted his comrades and opened fire with a machine gun, killing at least twenty of the enemy soldiers and disrupting their initial attack. He realized that if he abandoned his position there would be nothing to hold back the surging North Vietnamese soldiers and his entire company withdrawal would be jeopardized – as a result he told his comrades to move to the back and that he would supply cover for them. He continued to deliver a heavy and accurate volume of suppressive fire against the enemy until he was mortally wounded and had to be carried during the withdrawal.

Lozada was posthumously awarded the Medal of Honor in December 1969.

Medal of Honor citation

Post-War Memorials
PFC Lozada was buried with full military honors in Long Island National Cemetery located in Farmingdale, New York.  His name is located in the Vietnam Veterans Memorial Wall Panel 30E-Row 045. His name is also inscribed in "El Monumento de la Recordación" (Monument of Remembrance), dedicated to Puerto Rico's fallen soldiers and situated in front of the Capitol Building in San Juan, Puerto Rico. The Bronx honored him by naming a playground in his honor located behind 175 Willis Ave. On November 11, 2008, the Government of Puerto Rico unveiled in the Capitol Rotunda the oil portrait of PFC Carlos James Lozada.

Military decorations awarded

See also

List of Puerto Ricans
List of Puerto Rican military personnel
Puerto Rican recipients of the Medal of Honor
List of Hispanic Medal of Honor recipients
List of Medal of Honor recipients for the Vietnam War

References

Further reading
Puertorriquenos Who Served With Guts, Glory, and Honor. Fighting to Defend a Nation Not Completely Their Own; by : Greg Boudonck;

External links

1946 births
1967 deaths
People from Caguas, Puerto Rico
Puerto Rican recipients of the Medal of Honor
Puerto Rican Army personnel
United States Army soldiers
United States Army Medal of Honor recipients
Burials at Long Island National Cemetery
American military personnel killed in the Vietnam War
Vietnam War recipients of the Medal of Honor
United States Army personnel of the Vietnam War